Potamalosa richmondia, the Australian freshwater herring, is a fish that is endemic to Australia.  It is the only member of its genus.

References

Clupeidae
Taxa named by William John Macleay
Fish described in 1879
Monotypic fish genera
Monotypic freshwater fish genera
Monotypic ray-finned fish genera